13 chansons nouvelles is the seventh French studio album by Joe Dassin. It came out in 1973 on CBS Disques.

Track listing

References

External links 
 

1973 albums
Joe Dassin albums
CBS Disques albums

Albums produced by Jacques Plait